North Korea women's national softball team is the national team for North Korea.  The team competed at the 2006 ISF Women's World Championship in Beijing, China where they finished thirteenth.

References

External links 
 International Softball Federation

Softball
Women's national softball teams
Softball in North Korea